Ammonium bisulfate, also known as ammonium hydrogen sulfate, is a white, crystalline solid with the formula (NH4)HSO4. This salt is the product of the half-neutralization of sulfuric acid by ammonia.

Production
It is commonly collected as a byproduct of the "acetone cyanohydrin route" to the commodity chemical methyl methacrylate. 

It can also be obtained by hydrolysis of sulfamic acid in aqueous solution, which produces the salt in high purity:
 H3NSO3 + H2O → [NH4]+[HSO4]−
It also arises by the thermal decomposition of ammonium sulfate:
 (NH4)2SO4   →   (NH4)HSO4  +  NH3

Applications
It can be further neutralized with ammonia to form ammonium sulfate, a valuable fertilizer. It can be used as a weaker alternative to sulfuric acid, although sodium bisulfate is much more common.

Natural occurrence
A related compound of the (NH4)3H(SO4)2 formula, occurs as the rare mineral letovicite, known from coal fire environments.

References

Ammonium compounds
Sulfates